Encyclopedia.com (also known as HighBeam Encyclopedia) is an online encyclopedia. It aggregates information from other published dictionaries, encyclopedias and reference works including pictures and videos.

History
The website was launched by Infonautics in March 1998. Infonautics was acquired by Tucows in August 2001. In August 2002, Patrick Spain bought Encyclopedia.com and its sister website eLibrary from Tucows and incorporated them in a new company called Alacritude, LLC (a combination of Alacrity and Attitude). The business became known as Highbeam Research and was eventually sold to Gale. The website is currently operated by Chicago-based company Highbeam Research, a subsidiary of reference publisher Gale, which in itself is a subsidiary of Cengage.

Content 
Encyclopedia.com allows users to access information on a subject from multiple encyclopedias and dictionary sources, and has nearly 200,000 entries and 50,000 topic summaries. It provides a collection of online encyclopedias and entries from various sources, including Oxford University Press, Columbia Encyclopedia and Gale, its parent company.

References

External links 
 

American online encyclopedias
21st-century encyclopedias
Internet properties established in 1998